Camp Orange: Slimey Hollow is the name of the second season of the children's reality series Camp Orange. It was aired on Nickelodeon Australia in 2006.

Camp Orange

Camp Orange was the title of the series. The second series, was set at a mysterious Ghost town called Slimey Hollow and follows the bizarre family history of Edward Slimey. The show was produced and directed by Total Perception (Phillip Tanner -Prod/Director & Jason Critelli - Prod) for Nickelodeon Australia. Mike Watson was the E.P. for Nickelodeon.

Members

Weekly Summary

Trivia
 A requirement to be in any Camp Orange installment is to be between the ages 10 and 13.
 The third season, Camp Orange: The Mystery of Spaghetti Creek, aired in mid-2007.
 The Salted Peanuts were an impressive duo, coming second in nearly every competition.
 The Thunder Monkeys play much basketball.
 Thorsten is Dutch.
 The Thunder Monkeys were identified as "Kingo(now known as Kingy)" and "Woodzy".
 The Dancing Dodos were identified as "Dutchie" and "Chez/Chester".
 Maude only got slimed once when the Salted Peanuts flicked a minuscule amount of slime onto her boot during their first visit to the Dunny of Destiny.
 The Thunder Monkeys hold the record for most challenges won by a single team on camp orange, having won 7 out of the 12 challenges

2000s Australian reality television series
Nickelodeon (Australia and New Zealand) original programming
2006 Australian television series debuts
2006 Australian television series endings